Koki Saito (齋藤功貴, Saitō Kōki, born 16 September 1989) is a Japanese show jumping competitor. He represented Japan at the 2020 Summer Olympics in Tokyo 2021, competing in individual jumping.

References

 

1989 births
Living people
Japanese male equestrians
Equestrians at the 2020 Summer Olympics
Olympic equestrians of Japan
Show jumping riders
People from Katori, Chiba
Sportspeople from Chiba Prefecture